Temný kraj (The Dark Country) is a Czech television series that aired on TV Prima in 2017–2019.

The main character of the series is a Prague policeman Petr Kraj who specializes in serial murders. He leaves for the countryside to recover after a sudden collapse. Here he meets colleagues from the district department who investigate a complex case of serial murder. The ambiguous name of the series refers not only to the place of its action, but also to the name of the main character. Each serial murder case is divided into two episodes.

The first season of the series was broadcast from January to April 2017. It was among the most successful series of Prima in recent years. The average viewership of the twelve episodes was 1.5 million viewers over the age of 15 with a share of 32%. The most watched episode of the first season even crossed the 1.7 million viewers mark (15+).

Village of Břeh, in which the series is set, is actually Konojedy near Prague. The majority of the series was filmed in Konojedy and its surroundings.

Cast
Lukáš Vaculík as Petr Kraj
Kristýna Fuitová Nováková as Naďa Hamplová
Jan Teplý as Vojta Coufal
Karel Zima as Pepa Sláma
Martin Trnavský as Luboš Bach
Saša Rašilov as PhDr. Kryštof Steiner
Jan Novotný as Lojza Hampl
Tereza Kostková as MVDr. Tereza Coufalová
Zdena Studénková as Libuše Kvapilová

References

External links 
Official site
IMDB site
ČSFD site

Czech crime television series
2017 Czech television series debuts
Prima televize original programming